Síle, Gaelic-Irish female given name.

Bearers of the name

 Síle Ní Mathgamna, died 1473.
 Síle Ní Siurtáin, died 1485.
 Síle Níc Ceallaigh, died 1486.
 Síle Níc Carthaigh, died 1489.
 Síle Ní Raghalligh, died 1491.
 Síle Níc Uidhir, died 1499.
 Síle Ní Domnaill, died 1521.
 Síle Ní Fhallamhain, died 1530.
 Síle Ní Birnn, died 1531.
 Síle Ní Domhnaill, died 1544.
 Síle Ní Domhnaill, died 1582.
 Síle Ní Falluin, died 1589.
 Sile Horgan, seventh president of the Camogie Association, 1949-52.
 Síle de Valera, former Fianna Fáil politician, born 1954.
 Síle Seoige, Irish television presenter, born 1979.
 Síle Ní Bhraonain, Irish television presenter, born 1983.
 Síle Burns, Cork camogie player and physiotherapist, born 1985.

See also

 Sheila

External links
 http://medievalscotland.org/kmo/AnnalsIndex/Feminine/Sile.shtml

Irish-language feminine given names